Mohammad Khan (also Romanized as Moḩammad Khān; also known as Golshāh Khān) is a village in Dust Mohammad Rural District, in the Central District of Hirmand County, Sistan and Baluchestan Province, Iran. At the 2006 census, its population was 77, in 18 families.

References 

Populated places in Hirmand County